Panagiotis Triantafyllou is a Greek wheelchair fencer who competes in épée and sabre. He represented Greece at the Summer Paralympics in 2012, 2016 and 2021. He won the silver medal in the men's sabre B event at the 2016 Summer Paralympics. At the 2020 Summer Paralympics held in Tokyo, Japan, he won the bronze medal in the same event.

In the November 2019 event of the IWAS Wheelchair Fencing World Cup he won the gold medal in the men's sabre B competition.

References

External links 
 

Panathinaikos players with disabilities
Living people
Year of birth missing (living people)
Place of birth missing (living people)
Greek male épée fencers
Paralympic athletes of Greece
Wheelchair fencers at the 2012 Summer Paralympics
Wheelchair fencers at the 2016 Summer Paralympics
Wheelchair fencers at the 2020 Summer Paralympics
Medalists at the 2016 Summer Paralympics
Medalists at the 2020 Summer Paralympics
Paralympic silver medalists for Greece
Paralympic bronze medalists for Greece
Paralympic medalists in wheelchair fencing
Greek male sabre fencers